Darren Nigel Molloy born  in London, England is a former rugby union player. He played as a prop for Wasps and Gloucester in the English Premiership and Leinster in the Celtic League. Molloy also played for team 'England’ . He is now a successful coach, and his love for rugby continues. He is also a father to Sean and Gracie, and a husband to Kelly.

Whilst at Wasps he helped them win the Anglo-Welsh Cup in 1999 and 2000.

Molloy has recently moved to the flagship Folkestone Academy School as Director of Rugby and is currently setting up their new rugby academy. The inaugural year for this will be 2011/12. In conjunction with this, he is also Director of Rugby at nearby Folkestone RFC with the intention of promotion, development and retention of local young players.

Molloy is also working with the RFU on their Scrum Factory and Rugby Ready courses which he delivers in the Kent area.

References

External links
Wasps profile

1972 births
Living people
English rugby union players
Gloucester Rugby players
Irish rugby union players
Leinster Rugby players
Rugby union players from London
Rugby union props
Wasps RFC players